Rian Craig Johnson (born December 17, 1973) is an American filmmaker. He made his directorial debut with the neo-noir mystery film Brick (2005), which received positive reviews and grossed nearly $4 million on a $450,000 budget. Transitioning to higher-profile films, Johnson achieved mainstream recognition for writing and directing the science-fiction thriller Looper (2012) to critical and commercial success. Johnson landed his largest project when he wrote and directed the space opera Star Wars: The Last Jedi (2017), which grossed over $1 billion. He returned to the mystery genre with Knives Out (2019) and its sequel Glass Onion (2022), both of which earned him Academy Award nominations for Best Original Screenplay and Best Adapted Screenplay, respectively.

Additionally, Johnson is also known for directing three highly acclaimed episodes for the television series Breaking Bad (2008–2013), namely the episodes "Ozymandias", "Fly", and "Fifty-One"; for the latter, he received the Directors Guild of America Award for Outstanding Directing – Drama Series in 2013. He also created a murder mystery series titled Poker Face for Peacock with Natasha Lyonne.

Early life
Johnson was born on December 17, 1973, in Silver Spring, Maryland. He grew up in Denver, Colorado, until sixth grade, when he moved to San Clemente, California. He attended San Clemente High School (graduating in 1992), where Brick was predominantly filmed. He attended the University of Southern California and graduated from the USC School of Cinematic Arts in 1996. Johnson's second short film, Evil Demon Golfball from Hell!!!, loosely based on Edgar Allan Poe's "The Tell-Tale Heart", was included as an easter egg on the Looper Blu-ray.

Career
Johnson has said he was inspired to become a film director after seeing Woody Allen's 1977 film, Annie Hall. "It moved me in a way that very few other films have moved me. That's something that, I pray to God, if I am able to keep making movies, I can only hope, twenty years down the line maybe, I'll be able to approach."

Johnson's debut film, Brick, is a crime drama released in 2005 and made for just under $500,000. Johnson has often said that he looked to the novels of Dashiell Hammett as inspiration for the film's unique use of language. While the film is classified as a film noir, Johnson claims that no references were made to film noir during production, so as to focus the production away from reproducing a genre piece. Brick was released on DVD by Focus Features.

Johnson directed the video for the Mountain Goats' song "Woke Up New" in 2006. He is a professed fan of the band and was asked to direct the video when bandleader John Darnielle noticed a reference to them in the credits for Brick. A song is credited to "The Hospital Bombers Experience", which is a reference to the Mountain Goats song titled "The Best Ever Death Metal Band in Denton". Johnson also directed a live performance film of the Mountain Goats' 2009 album The Life of the World to Come. The film consists of a single shot, depicting Darnielle performing the entire album on guitar and piano with minimal accompaniment. This film was screened in New York City, Chicago, Seattle, and Portland, Oregon upon its completion, and was released as a limited edition DVD on Record Store Day (April 17, 2010).

Johnson's second film, The Brothers Bloom, is a con-man story released in theaters in May 2009 to moderately positive critical reviews. On Metacritic, the film was assigned a weighted average score of 55 out of 100 based on 26 reviews from mainstream critics.

In March 2010, Johnson announced that he was directing an episode of the TV series Breaking Bad for its third season. The episode, "Fly", aired on May 23, 2010. Johnson directed a second episode of the show, "Fifty-One", which aired on August 5, 2012, and earned him a Directors Guild of America Award. He directed a third episode, "Ozymandias", which received high praise from critics, frequently cited as being 'one of the best television episodes' to air.

Johnson has made a number of short films, some of which are available on his website. His short film from high school titled Ninja Ko is available as an easter egg on the Brick DVD. The Brothers Bloom DVD features a short, Buster Keaton-esque silent film he made in college. After working with Joseph Gordon-Levitt on Brick, the two shot a short film in Paris, France titled Escargots. In 2002, he directed a short film titled The Psychology of Dream Analysis, which is available to view on his Vimeo account. Johnson directed the episode "Manifest Destiny" of the TV series Terriers.

Johnson's third film, Looper, began shooting in Louisiana on January 24, 2011 and was released on September 28, 2012, by TriStar Pictures and FilmDistrict. Set in the near future, it has been described as dark science fiction, and involves hitmen whose victims are sent from the future. The film opened the 2012 Toronto International Film Festival and the 2012 Palo Alto International Film Festival. Looper was a surprise success at the box office.

On June 20, 2014, news broke that Johnson would write and direct the eighth installment in the Star Wars film series. Johnson confirmed the report that following month and the film, Star Wars: The Last Jedi, was released on December 15, 2017, to positive reviews from critics and audiences. After Colin Trevorrow departed Episode IX, Johnson turned down an offer from Lucasfilm to write and direct the follow-up to The Last Jedi. On November 9, 2017, it was announced that Johnson would write a new trilogy of Star Wars films, separate from the main story arc of previous films in the franchise, and would direct the first installment of his trilogy.

Following The Last Jedi, Johnson directed the murder mystery film Knives Out, starring Daniel Craig, Ana de Armas and Christopher Plummer. He penned the script and co-produced with longtime producing partner Ram Bergman. Knives Out was released on November 27, 2019, and was a major success with critics, as well as audiences, grossing over $300 million at the box office worldwide. It earned Johnson his first Academy Award nomination, for Best Original Screenplay.

In September 2019, Johnson and producer Ram Bergman launched T-Street, a company that will generate original content for film and TV shows. The venture is fully capitalized by global media company Valence Media. T-Street launched with a first look deal with Valence Media's Media Rights Capital for film and television projects.  Valence Media holds a substantial minority equity stake in the company. Johnson and Bergman intend to make their own original creations through the company, and produce others.

Due to the success of Knives Out, Lionsgate announced that a sequel was officially approved in February 2020, with Johnson set to return to write and direct the film. In July 2020, Johnson directed a commercial for the augmented mobile video game Pokémon Go. In March 2021, it was announced that Johnson was writing/directing a ten-episode mystery drama television series for Peacock titled Poker Face, starring Natasha Lyonne, which premiered on the service on January 26, 2023. That same month, it was reported that Netflix had obtained the rights to two sequels to Knives Out for around $450 million. Filming on the first Knives Out sequel, Glass Onion: A Knives Out Mystery, began on June 28, 2021. After premiering at the 2022 Toronto International Film Festival, the film received a one-week theatrical release across the United States and in other international markets from November 23 to 29, 2022, before streaming on Netflix beginning on December 23.

Personal life
Johnson is a folk singer and banjo player. His brother is music producer Aaron Johnson. His cousin Nathan Johnson composed the scores for Brick, The Brothers Bloom, Looper, Knives Out and Glass Onion. Rian and Nathan make up a folk duo called the Preserves.

Johnson has been married to film writer and podcaster Karina Longworth since 2018.

Filmography

Short films

Feature films

Television

Other works
Documentary films
 The Mountain Goats: The Life of the World to Come (2010) 

Music videos

Commercials

Acting roles

Technical credits

Accolades

References

External links

The Man in the Herringbone Hat by Rian Johnson 
Interview with Rian Johnson on Futuremovies.co.uk

1973 births
American banjoists
American folk singers
American male screenwriters
American music video directors
American television directors
Directors Guild of America Award winners
Film directors from California
Film directors from Maryland
Living people
People from San Clemente, California
People from Silver Spring, Maryland
Science fiction film directors
Screenwriters from California
Sundance Film Festival award winners
USC School of Cinematic Arts alumni
Writers from Maryland
Postmodernist filmmakers